The Dan Ryan branch is a  long section of the Chicago "L" system located on the South Side of Chicago, Illinois. It is operated by the Chicago Transit Authority, as part of its Red Line service and is normally through-routed downtown towards the North Side via the State Street subway. As of February 2013, the branch serves (on average) 45,355 passengers per weekday. As part of the CTA's busiest rapid transit line, it is operated 24 hours a day, 365 days a year. The branch serves the Chinatown, Armour Square, Fuller Park, Englewood, Greater Grand Crossing, Chatham and Roseland neighborhoods.

History
After World War II, the CTA built three new branches of the "L" through the medians of freeways. The first was the Congress Branch, which opened on June 22, 1958. On July 30, 1958, proposals for a line in the median of the Dan Ryan Expressway and a line in the median of the Kennedy Expressway were among a series of projects proposed by the CTA. The Dan Ryan branch was built between 1967 and 1969 for a total cost of $38 million. When the branch opened on September 28, 1969, it was connected to the Lake Street Elevated via the Loop and the South Side Main Line. The branch was successful from the start, exceeding forecasts by 10%, and carrying an average of 99,000 passengers per day by the end of 1970. The opening of the Dan Ryan branch resulted in a decrease in ridership on the South Side Elevated and its two branches to Englewood and Jackson Park. On January 4, 1978, several large cracks were discovered under the elevated portion of the Dan Ryan branch near Clark and 18th Streets. Service was suspended on this portion of the branch from January 4 to January 17, while repairs were being made.

On February 21, 1993, when the L routes were to be color-coded, the Dan Ryan branch became part of the present day Red Line. The CTA had decided that the Dan Ryan Branch's routing was inefficient due to the fact that the Dan Ryan branch and North Side Main Line had a comparatively higher number of riders than the Lake Branch and South Side Elevated. On February 21, 1993, the Dan Ryan branch was connected to the State Street subway and the North Side Main Line with service to Howard, while the Lake Branch would be paired with the South Side Elevated and its Englewood and Jackson Park branches via The Loop to form the Green Line. The Dan Ryan branch connected to the State Street subway via the subway's new extension to 16th and Wentworth, which was built from 1985 to 1990.

The Dan Ryan branch initially used concrete railroad ties, but these were replaced by wooden ties after the concrete ties began to age more rapidly than expected. On April 17, 2004, the CTA began a $192.5 million rehabilitation of the Dan Ryan branch, which included installing a new signal system, replacing and upgrading substations, renovating platform canopies, and installing new elevators at the 47th and 69th stations.

Red Line South reconstruction project
On November 3, 2011, local funding and $646 million in state funding was announced by Mayor Rahm Emanuel, Governor Pat Quinn, CTA President Forrest Claypool, several state lawmakers, and nearly a dozen aldermen, for a reconstruction project on the branch. Two options concerning the duration of construction were considered: A 5-month duration with no service the entire time or 4 years of weekend-only work. The choice of a 5-month duration with no service the entire time was chosen.

On May 19, 2013, the Dan Ryan branch closed as part of the Red Line South Reconstruction Project which costed $425 million. With the branch being 44 years old, track conditions had been causing Red Line riders to experience longer travel times, overcrowded trains and less reliable service. As part of the project, the Garfield, 63rd, and 87th stations were renovated and equipped with an elevator, making all Dan Ryan branch stations fully accessible for passengers with disabilities. During reconstruction, Red Line trains were rerouted on the South Side Elevated to Ashland/63rd. The newly reconstructed Dan Ryan branch and the nine stations reopened on October 20, 2013.

Extension

Proposals are currently underway to extend the Red Line south from 95th Street. The CTA developed nine different proposed routes, one of which includes routing the Red Line down the median of the Bishop Ford Freeway and another in the median of Interstate 57. During an alternatives analysis meeting on April 11, 2007, CTA narrowed further study down to five possible routes, two for bus rapid transit and three for heavy rail (rapid) transit. The two bus routes would travel south from the 95th/Dan Ryan terminal either down Halsted Street or Michigan Avenue, while the heavy rail routes left for consideration were the Halsted and Michigan corridors (either underground or elevated) as well as the Union Pacific Railroad corridor (elevated or trench), which would traverse southeastward toward the South Shore Line. In October 2008, the CTA commissioned a $150,000-study of an extension due south to 130th/Stony Island in the community area of Riverdale.

Alternatives
In December 2008, at the Screen 2 presentation of the federally mandated Alternatives Analysis Study, the possible corridors and modes of transit were furthered narrowed down to either Halsted Street (Bus Rapid Transit or elevated Heavy Rail Transit) and the Union Pacific Railroad corridor (elevated Heavy Rail Transit).

In December 2009, the CTA identified the Locally Preferred Alternative as the Union Pacific corridor. A map and description of the route are found here:  Multiple Environmental Impact Studies will be carried out, and will determine exact alignments and design.

The alignment consists of a new elevated rail line between 95th/Dan Ryan and a new terminal station at 130th Street, paralleling the Union Pacific Railroad and the South Shore Line through the Far South Side neighborhoods of Roseland,
Washington Heights, West Pullman, and Riverdale. In addition to the terminal station at 130th, three new stations would be built at 103rd, 111th, and Michigan, and a new yard and shop would be built at 120th street. Basic engineering, along with an environmental impact statement, are currently underway.

Station listing

Image gallery

References

External links
Red Line: Dan Ryan Branch

Railway lines in Chicago
Chicago Transit Authority
Railway lines opened in 1969